East End Forever is a 2011 Quebec documentary film about seven young people from the Hochelaga-Maisonneuve district of Montreal. Written and directed by Carole Laganière. The film debuted at the Grand Library on February 18, 2011, before theatrical release on May 13, 2011.

Synopsis
In 2003, seven children had aspirations for their futures. Revisiting the neighbourhood and the children eight years later, L’Est pour toujours documents the progress they have made in their lives. Marianne Racine reconnected with his father, only to find he lives in Vancouver and does not speak French. Maxime Desjardins-Tremblay has combined work and study as a film and television actor. Though wishing to become a rapper, he still gets caught up in problems with street gangs. Proulx-Roy and Jean-Roch Beauregard, having spent time in youth centers and reform schools, are both still seeking their paths in life. Valérie Allard has aspirations of working with others through social services. Samantha Goyer has completed school. At 21, Vanessa Dumont is the oldest of the seven. She looks far younger than her biological age, but this affects her search for both job and boyfriend, and she deals with dark moods. The film shares how a person's future is not always determined by where they grew up.

Cast
 Marianne Racine
 Maxime Desjardins-Tremblay
 Maxime Proulx-Roy
 Jean-Roch Beauregard
 Valérie Allard
 Samantha Goyer
 Vanessa Dumont

Background
In 2003, Carole Laganière created the film Vues de l’Est (English title East End Kids) to document the lives of seven children, aged eight to twelve, who were being raised in the low income Montreal, Quebec, Canada neighbourhood of Hochelaga-Maisonneuve. At that time the children had aspirations for bright futures. Having kept in contact with the children over the intervening years, Laganière revisited the neighbourhood and the children after eight years to document what progress they may have made in their lives.  The film is produced by Informaction Productions.

Reception
Montreal Mirror, in speaking of Carole Laganière's 2003 documentary Vues de l’Est and the follow up of L’Est pour toujours, wrote that viewers need not have seen the earlier film to be able to appreciate this later offering, "especially since Laganière weaves in moments from the original along with footage shot at intervals in the years since."  They noted a similarity to Michael Apted’s Up Series of films, as the viewer sees the subjects grow before their eyes. The reviewer writes that the subjects "discuss their lives and problems with remarkable frankness," and that while the film's tone is occasionally depressing as the viewer learns that some of the subjects are repeating the patterns seen eightyears earlier, the director "captures their stories with heart, leaving you wishing for a large-scale project such as Apted’s to come out of this—and hoping that these kids somehow turn out okay."

Le Cinema wrote that the film was "...touchant et révélateur, s'intitule et il rappelle au tournant le brio de plusieurs documentaires québécois," (...touching and revealing, and seen as brilliant of the several extant Quebec documentaries) and after expanding on the individuals whose lives are being documented, concluded "En espérant que la cinéaste renoue avec ses sujets dans cinq ou dix ans, un peu comme XV le fait périodiquement dans sa série «Up»" (it is hoped that the filmmaker returns to his subjects in another five or ten years, giving them the regular coverage as has Michael Apted for the subjects of the Up Series).

References

External links
 
 
Radio-Canada. Article.  May 13, 2011
"L'Est pour toujours: le Star Académie des petites". André Duchesne. Film critique May 13, 2011
Voir Magazine, Montreal. Review. by Guillaume Fournier May 14, 2011

Canadian documentary films
Canadian independent films
2011 films
Documentary films about Montreal
Quebec films
Documentary films about children
Mercier–Hochelaga-Maisonneuve
French-language Canadian films
2010s English-language films
2010s Canadian films